C. J. Roberts  (born September 8, 1991) is a Canadian football cornerback. He played college football at CSU–Pueblo ThunderWolves.

Professional career

Arizona Cardinals 
Roberts signed with the Arizona Cardinals on May 5, 2015. Roberts was released on September 5, 2015.

Tampa Bay Buccaneers

Roberts signed with the Tampa Bay Buccaneers on December 30, 2015. He was waived on April 29, 2016.

Winnipeg Blue Bombers
Roberts has accepted a spot on the 10-member practice squad for the Winnipeg Blue Bombers start of the 2016 CFL season. He played in seven games for the Blue Bombers in 2016, recording 26 defensive tackles, two interceptions, and one touchdown.

References

External links
Tampa Bay Buccaneers bio

1991 births
Living people
American football cornerbacks
Canadian football defensive backs
American players of Canadian football
Arizona Cardinals players
Tampa Bay Buccaneers players
People from Boynton Beach, Florida
Players of American football from Florida
Winnipeg Blue Bombers players